Osakai is a village in Lower Dir District of the Khyber Pakhtunkhwa province of Pakistan. Osakai is divided into Osakai Bala and Osakai Payeen. It comes under Union Council Kotigram and under Tehsil Adenzai.
Osakai as a whole consists of Karimabad, Dagai, Ghwandai, Qazi Abad and Lowarha.
Osakai has a hospital unit, a government high school for girls and also a government high school for boys. Osakai has some historical places (e.g., Kafir Kot, Sroo Manroo (Red Fort) and also many picnic spots (e.g., Osakai waterfall, Khan Baba, Bar Charhay, and small water dams). Osakai also has a quarry where stone slabs for graves are extracted. They can also be used for sewage systems.

Tribes in Osakai include Sarkani Khail, Roghani, Uthman Khail, Tajak, Degaan, Shinwari, Sadaat, Wardag, and Babakhail.

Gallery

See also
 Lower Dir District
 Timergara
 Chakdara
 Swat District

References 

Populated places in Lower Dir District
Lower Dir District